Klaus Abbelen (born 15 September 1960) is a German race car driver.

After starting racing Ferraris in the 1990s, he became the Euro GT Series champion in 2000. He has also recently competed in the FIA GT Championship, as well as in the Le Mans Endurance Series.

In 2006, he and Sabine Schmitz drove the #97 Porsche 997 in the VLN endurance racing series on the Nürburgring, entered by Land Motorsport.

Early career 
Abbelen started his endurance career in 1999, joining class A in the Ferrari Porsche Challenge in a Porsche, finishing second in his class. In 2002, Abbelen attempted to run the 24 Hours of Nürburgring, but failed to get in. In the same year, Abbelen joined the A Class in the Euro GT Series, where he joined Team W&A, placing 3rd overall.

Career 
In 2003, Abbelen joined multiple series, beginning with the Euro GT Series. Then, he joined the French GT Championship, driving a Porsche 911 for Chateau Sport for 2 races along with racer Stéphane Ortelli. The pair would fail to reach podium and would settle for a 41st in the final standings. Abbelen would then join Zwaan's Racing in the FIA GT Championship, driving their Chrysler Viper with Arjan van der Zwaan and Robert van der Zwaan. In 7 races, the team would fail to reach podium, finishing the championship 19th in points. Abbelen would then move to the Porsche Supercup, racing for DeWalt Racing driving their Porsche 911 for a single race.

In 2004, Abberlen ran in the Le Mans Endurance Series, driving a Saleen S7-R for Konrad Motorsport in one race. In 2004, Abberlen returned to Zwann's Racing in the FIA GT Championship before not making podium again.

References

External links 
Company website

1960 births
German racing drivers
European Le Mans Series drivers
Living people
Racing drivers from North Rhine-Westphalia
Porsche Supercup drivers
24 Hours of Spa drivers
24 Hours of Daytona drivers
WeatherTech SportsCar Championship drivers
24H Series drivers

Nürburgring 24 Hours drivers
Le Mans Cup drivers
Porsche Carrera Cup Germany drivers